David Bell (born April 17, 1954) is an American composer, known for his music for television shows. From 1984 to 1991 he contributed music to 79 episodes of Murder, She Wrote, 5 episodes of "Dr. Quinn, Medicine Woman", followed by 66 episodes of Star Trek shows from 1994 to 2003. In 2002 he won the ASCAP Award (Top TV Series) for Enterprise, shared with the series' other regular composers.

Television scores (partial)

External links

David Bell at Star Trek Soundtracks

1954 births
Living people
American television composers